Brad Allen Ottis (born August 2, 1972) is a former defensive end in the National Football League. He played for the Los Angeles/St.Louis Rams and the Arizona Cardinals. Ottis played on the same Wayne State College football team as Byron Chamberlain, Brett Salisbury and Damon Thomas (American football) who all played professionally. After playing in the NFL, Ottis signed with the Sioux City Bandits.

References

1972 births
Living people
American football defensive ends
Wayne State Wildcats football players
Los Angeles Rams players
St. Louis Rams players
Arizona Cardinals players
People from Wahoo, Nebraska
Sioux City Bandits players